Tim Alioto is a retired American soccer defender who spent most of his career with the amateur Milwaukee Bavarians.  He played professionally for four years in the American Indoor Soccer Association.

In 1968, Alioto began his youth career with a Salvation Army team.  In 1974, he joined the Milwaukee Bavarians.  In 1976, Alioto graduated from Madison High School.  He had played high school soccer as a sophomore, but stopped playing for his high school team after joining the Bavarians.  In 1977, the Bavarians went to the final of the McGuire Cup where they fell to the Santa Ana Broncos.  Alioto did not attend college and remained played for the Bavarians senior team with  short stints with the Milwaukee Sports Club and Milwaukee Serbians (1986-1987).  In 1986, Alioto turned professional with the Milwaukee Wave of the American Indoor Soccer Association.  The team released him at during the 1990 off-season and Alioto once again returned to the Bavarians.  In 1993, Alioto and his team mates lost in the semifinals of the 1993 U.S. Open Cup.

In 2007, the Wisconsin Soccer Association inducted Alioto into its Hall of Fame.

External links
 Career stats

References

Living people
1958 births
Soccer players from Milwaukee
American Indoor Soccer Association players
Milwaukee Bavarians players
Milwaukee Wave players
Association football defenders
American soccer players